The Bamileke War, often known as  ("Cameroon War"),  (the "Hidden War"), or the Cameroonian Independence War, is the name of the independence struggle between Bamileke Cameroon's nationalist movement and France. The movement was spearheaded by the Cameroonian Peoples Union (UPC). Even after independence, the rebellion continued, shaping contemporary politics. The war began with riots in 1955 and continued after Cameroon gained independence in 1960. Following independence, the first President of Cameroon, Ahmadou Ahidjo requested continued French military intervention to fight the UPC rebels. The UPC rebellion was largely crushed by the Cameroonian Armed Forces and French Army by 1964. This war is often forgotten because it occurred at the height of France's biggest colonial independence struggle, the Algerian War.

The war is believed to have produced some 61,300 to 76,300 civilian deaths, according to estimates from the British embassy assembled in 1964, with 80% of the dead being from the Bamileke Region. General Max Briand, the commander of all French military forces in Cameroon, gave an estimate of 20,000 people killed in the Bamileke Region in 1960 alone. Some modern estimates for deaths go into the hundreds of thousands or even millions, but are believed to not be reliable. Overall, estimating the number of deaths is difficult as the French administration did not keep meticulous records of the number of people killed.

Causes of war 
Cameroon's own movement began in the early 1950s, after the founding of the Cameroon Peoples Union (UPC), Cameroon's first and most prominent nationalist party. The party was centered around two main goals: separating from France and establishing a socialist economy. The party was founded in 1948 by Ruben Um Nyobe and his colleague, Felix-Roland Moumie.

The burgeoning nationalist movement was met with the challenge of a colonial administration that wanted to neutralize it. In a letter that was written to the colonial high commission in 1954, Um Nyobe wrote:“For six years, the Union of Cameroonian People has resisted and will continue to resist violent hostility from French colonial authorities. One must write a book to cover the inventory of forces and structures of power that were used to combat our organization”Um Nyobe's words allude to the tensions that existed between the nationalist movement and the colonial administration. Attempts to thwart the nationalist movement were not unique to Cameroon, but rather a natural extension of French colonial politics at the time. The French colonial administration's efforts to suppress UPC led to a brutal civil war.

Elites and the war 
For many Cameroonian nationalists, embroiling oneself in the war was not an immediate inclination. In fact, many attempted to cooperate and participate democratically in the French colonial political system. Many of these were Cameroonians who had fully assimilated French law, language, and customs and were called Evolue. They admired the French lifestyle and denigrated local mores. Yet, some of Cameroon's early revolutionaries would qualify as evolue.

Likewise, candidats administratifs were candidates that were favored by the colonial administrations.  This practice was first introduced in Cameroon in 1945 when the colonial government was looking to create a class of proteges. During a provisional election, they placed Chief Andre Fouda against popular anti-colonialist Douala Manga Bell. The colonial administration favored Fouda and worked to ensure his victory.

Um Nyobe's leadership 
Even members of the UPC tried to participate in the French political process at first. During legislative elections in June 1951, Ruben Um Nyobe presented himself to electors. To hinder Um Nyobe's chances, the colonial administration waited until the last minute to accept  Nyobe's candidacy.  The administration also employed methods of voter suppression. Regions in which Nyobe's popularity was high, had few voting offices. This forced Nyobe's supporters to travel long distances just to cast their votes.  Nyobe ended up losing the election, winning only 3,100 votes.

Frustrated by election results and other injustices plaguing the country, Nyobe took to the international stage. He defended three times (1952, 1953, and 1954) the cause of independent Cameroon before the General Assembly of the United Nations. In his speeches, Nyobe denounced French colonial rule and called for the unification of British and French Cameroon.

The UPC's growing popularity became a threat for the French, and left latitude for other conflicts.

War chronology 
On April 22, 1955, the UPC published the "Proclamation Commune," which at the time, was considered a unilateral independence manifesto. However, the colonial administration viewed it as an unnecessary provocation.

Slowly, the French began to focus their energies on quelling the UPC movement, by stifling its leaders and their supporters. By May 1955, Um Nyobe and his peers went into hiding.

On May 22, 1955,  pro-independence riots broke out in Cameroon's major cities, Douala and Yaounde.  These riots would continue on until May 30, 1955,  when they were shut down by new French Colonial High Commissioner, Roland Pre.  Following the riots, on July 13, 1955,   French authorities officially banned the UPC. In the Sanaga-Maritime, the region of the country that contains the nation's largest cities Douala and Yaounde, the French Administration repressed these riots.

On December 18, 1956, the UPC began boycotting legislative elections. They enacted a “zone de maintien de l’ordre” at Sanaga-Maritime to squash nationalist upheaval. This designation gave the French the authority to exert any military force on Cameroonians living in Sanaga-Maritime.  In retaliation, the UPC established an armed branch of their party called Organizational National Committee (CNO).  From this moment, the war had officially begun.

As tensions heightened, the French quickly tried to retain order in the area. They brought in a lieutenant colonel, Jean Lamberton, from French Indochine to lead these efforts. From December 9, 1957, through 1958, Lamberton enacted what was known was the Cameroon Pacification Zone (ZoPac).  In this zone, locals were placed into camps and surveilled by the colonial army. The culmination of this pacification program was Um Nyobe's assassination in September 1958.

From January 18, 1957,  to May 25, 1959,  French authorities installed a similar martial zone in western regions of Cameroon. This region of the country is home to two of the nation's largest ethnic groups, the Bamileke and the Bassa. Localizing the conflict within the Bamileke region also served to quell the power of Bamileke elites. However, Bamileke and Bassa forces continually challenged the French rule.

In January 1959, the Cameroonian Liberation Army began fighting for Cameroon to become an independent nation. From this moment, the Cameroonians and the French were engaged in a fully fledged war.

On January 1, 1960, Cameroon gained independence,  and Ahmadou Ahidjo became the nation's first President.

War Crimes 
Both the rebels, Cameroonian military and the French military committed war crimes during the conflict. The French Army "frequently burned or otherwise completely destroyed entire villages infested with terrorists, resulting in the killing of an unknown number of non-terrorist civilians".

Related links 
History of Cameroon
Union of the Peoples of Cameroon
Algerian War
Bamileke people
Bassa
Félix-Roland Moumié
Ruben Um Nyobé

References

1950s in Cameroon
1960s in Cameroon
Wars of independence
Wars involving Cameroon
Wars involving France
1964 endings
1955 beginnings
Resistance to the French colonial empire
African resistance to colonialism